Sweet Trials is the second studio album by New Zealand-born singer Mark Williams. It was released in March 1976. The album peaked at number 14 on the Official New Zealand Music Chart.

Reception
Suedo Nim from Victoria University of Wellington said Sweet Trials failed "to keep the grade" stating; "By use of mainly homespun material, a determinedly 'rocky' oriented approach to the album and brass backing leftovers from Grunt Machine, the end result is an overall lowering of quality." adding "Alan Galbraith's handling of production is competent enough but seems to have come in too heavy on the brass, at the expense of some possible rich orchestrations. The backing does tend to be loose, loud in places and superfluous in others which makes one wonder whether the album was less a solo one than a vehicle for contract groups to remain in employ. However, the album does have its highlights and Mark Williams does not disappoint.".

Track listing
LP/Cassette (HSD 1046)

Charts

References

1976 albums
EMI Records albums
Mark Williams (singer) albums